Lobosculum is a genus (or a subgenus under Polygyra) of small air-breathing land snails, terrestrial pulmonate gastropod mollusks in the family Polygyridae.

Shell description
These are among the smallest snails in the Polygyridae, with shell diameters of about 4 to 6 mm (approximately 1/5 inch). The shells of this species usually have a velvety surface, as a consequence of numerous hair-like extensions of the surface covering of the shell, the periostracum.

Distribution
The known distribution of this species is limited to the  United States: along the Gulf of Mexico from Texas to Florida, as well as Georgia, and the Mississippi valley from Arkansas to Indiana.

Species 
This genus includes the following species and subspecies:

Lobosculum pustula (Férussac, 1822)
Lobosculum pustuloides (Bland, 1858)
Lobosculum leporinum (Gould, 1848)

References

Polygyridae